More Songs About Love and Hate is the third studio album by alternative rock band the Godfathers, released in May 1989 by Epic Records. It reached number 49 on the UK Albums Chart. The UK album cover shows Richard Burton and Elizabeth Taylor. It was the last Godfathers album to feature guitarist Kris Dollimore, who was replaced by Chris Burrows for 1991's Unreal World.

Critical reception
In a contemporary review in The Washington Post, Mark Jenkins argued that the album lacks great songs, calling it "11 songs in search of a hit." He, however, felt that it is more consistent than its predecessor Birth, School, Work, Death, writing, "None of the material soars, but only "Another You" sounds disposable." Jenkins highlighted "Walking Talking Johnny Cash Blues," a "change-of-pace" track with a "country flavor," as one of the album's best tracks. He concluded that More Songs About Love and Hate shows the band "sliding back into the amiable but underwhelming rut of such pub rock also-rans as Ducks Deluxe. The songs keep reaching for hooks - the submerged "yeah yeah yeahs" of "Pretty Girl," the pounding finale to "This Is Your Life," the bells that end the album-closing "Another You" - to distinguish generic melodies."

In a retrospective review, AllMusic's Mark Deming also felt that the album lacked an "instant classic single" like the title track from their previous album, but "otherwise it came close to matching that album's muscle and fury and confirmed the band had plenty of offer." Deming noted that the album had "just a dash more polish" than the band's previous work, and "their tough, meat-and-potatoes sound had picked up a bit more heft and precision along the way." He concluded that "while the songs on More Songs About Love and Hate aren't always as memorable as [Birth, School, Work, Death], there aren't any outright duds either," calling the album a "fine work".

Track listing

Note
Tracks 14-16 from Out on the Floor EP, 1990. Track 14 remixed by Steve Brown, tracks 15 and 16 remixed by Keith LeBlanc.

Personnel
Adapted from the album liner notes.

The Godfathers
Peter Coyne – lead vocals
Chris Coyne – bass, backing vocals
Kris Dollimore – guitar, keyboards, backing vocals
Mike Gibson – guitar, backing vocals
George Mazur – drums, percussion, backing vocals
Additional musicians
Harold Burgon - additional keyboards
Technical
Vic Maile – producer
Harold Burgon – engineer
Mike Bisgrove – sound engineer
Andy Wallace – mixing 
Grant Louden – sleeve
Jean Luke Epstein – sleeve
Bleddyn Gutz – cover illustration
Paul Cox – photography

Charts
Chart performance for More Songs About Love & Hate

References

1989 albums
Albums produced by Vic Maile
Epic Records albums
The Godfathers albums